María Guadalupe González Talavera (born February 29, 1992, in Lambaré) is a Paraguayan model and beauty pageant contestant who, after winning at the Nuestra Belleza Paraguay 2013 pageant, represented her country at the 62nd edition of Miss Universe pageant held in Moscow, Russia.

Early life
Guadalupe was a student at Colegio Santa Ines, located in Lambaré.

Nuestra Belleza Paraguay 2013
The Paraguayan representatives for Miss Universe, Miss World, and other international pageants, were chosen on June 27, 2013, in the city of Asuncion. The winner was María Guadalupe González Talavera, she competed in Miss Universe 2013, in Moscow, Russia, on November 9, 2013, but failed to place.

Pageant Contests
Guadalupe represented Paraguay at the  pageant held in Punta del Este, Uruguay, where she won two special awards: Best National Costume and Best Presence.
She also represented her country at the  pageant, held in Panama.
In 2013, she won the title of Nuestra Belleza Paraguay 2013. She then represented Paraguay at Miss Universe 2013 in Russia, on 9 November 2013.

References

External links
Official Nuestra Belleza Paraguay website

Living people
Miss Universe 2013 contestants
People from Lambaré
1992 births
Paraguayan beauty pageant winners
Paraguayan female models